Udara rona is a species of butterfly of the family Lycaenidae. It is found in South-east Asia.

Subspecies
Udara rona rona (Sulaweis, Maluku, New Guinea, New Britain)
Udara rona catius (Fruhstorfer, 1910) (north-eastern Sumatra)
Udara rona imeldae Schröder & Treadaway, 1998 (Philippines)

References

Butterflies described in 1894
Udara
Butterflies of Asia